Kökény is a  village in Baranya County, Hungary.

Geography
It has a population of 566 people (2005). Its postal code is 7668.

Demography 
 Magyars
 Croats

Culture 
In 2006, Kökény won the award of Hrvatska matica iseljenika (Croatian Heritage Foundation, organization of Croat diaspora), Najselo.
 folklore society «Ladislav Matušek»

External links
 Hrvatska matica iseljenika Kukinj - Najselo 2006.
 Croatica.hu Raspjevani baranjski Hrvati

Populated places in Baranya County